Françoise Odette Damado (born 11 December 1963) is a Senegalese sprinter. She competed in the women's 100 metres at the 1980 Summer Olympics.

References

External links
 

1963 births
Living people
Athletes (track and field) at the 1980 Summer Olympics
Senegalese female sprinters
Olympic athletes of Senegal
Place of birth missing (living people)
Olympic female sprinters